Gyarancita rondoni is a species of beetle in the family Cerambycidae, and the only species in the genus Gyarancita. It was described by Breuning in 1963.

References

Mesosini
Beetles described in 1963